David Owen Williams (February 7, 1880 – April 25, 1918) was a Welsh born relief pitcher in Major League Baseball who played briefly for the Boston Americans during the 1902 season. He was born in Scranton, Pennsylvania.

In a three-game career, Williams posted a 5.30 ERA in  innings of work, including seven strikeouts, 11 walks, three games finished, and 22 hits allowed without a decision.
 
Williams died in Hot Springs, Arkansas at age 38.

External links

Retrosheet

1880 births
1918 deaths
Boston Americans players
Major League Baseball pitchers
Major League Baseball players from Wales
Welsh baseball players
Sportspeople from Swansea
Philadelphia Athletics (minor league) players
Harrisburg Ponies players
Albany Senators players
Columbus Senators players
Shamokin (minor league baseball) players
British emigrants to the United States